Andrea Pellegrino and Andrea Vavassori defeated Thiago Seyboth Wild and Matías Soto in the final, 6–4, 3–6, [12–10] to win the doubles tennis title at the 2023 Chile Open.

Rafael Matos and Felipe Meligeni Alves were the reigning champions, but chose not to participate this year.

Seeds

Draw

Draw

References

External links
 Main draw

Chile Open - Doubles
2023 Doubles